Jean-Pierre Steinhofer is a French Army officer graduated in the École Spéciale Militaire de Saint-Cyr.

Jean-Pierre Steinhofer (16 April 1965 - 28 September 2011) is one of the young military writers whose articles were often read in the French Army at the end of the last century.
For example, in the beginning of the 1990s, his article "Beur ou ordinaire" obliged the French Ministry of Defense to cancel a project of affirmative action in favour of Arabian-ethnic French soldiers.

As the "chef de cabinet" of the French ambassador Head of ECMM in the Balkans in 1995, he wrote several articles denouncing the French military authorities pro-Serb attitude, and defended the Bosnian Croats and the Bosniaks (Bosnian Muslims).

Publications:

-  « Au-delà des plumes »: cartoon on the life in Saint-Cyr (in collaboration with Olivier Monteil). This cartoon described in a humoristic way the life in the prestigious and famous high military school. The first episodes were published in 1989 in the "Revue Saint-Cyr". It seems that the publication was stopped under the pressure of the French military authorities who didn't appreciate the sense of humour of the cartoon.

- "Beur ou ordinaire" (in "Armées d'Aujourd'hui"): article in French denouncing affirmative action in favor of JFOM (young French with Arabian origin), as issued by the French Ministry of Defense (directive 23 May 1990). "The 23 May 1990 is the day of the official creation of two categories of draftees; that's a very serious danger".

On 15 January 2010, he was quoted as independent expert in the petition towards the SCOTUS  for his critics about war on terror : he described "war on terror" as a "semantic, strategic and legal perversion", arguing that "terrorism is not an enemy, but rather a method of combat."

References 

1965 births
2011 deaths
French Army officers
French male non-fiction writers
French military writers
French Army personnel
Military personnel of the Bosnian War